The 2016 Indian Super League season was the third season of the Indian Super League, the football league, since its establishment in 2013. The season featured eight teams again, each playing 14 matches during the regular season before the finals. The regular season began on 1 October and ended on 4 December. The finals began on 10 December and concluded with the final on 18 December. The defending champions coming into the season were Chennaiyin.

At the end of the season, Atlético de Kolkata came out as champions after defeating the Kerala Blasters in a penalty shootout, 4–3, during the final. The match had ended 1–1 after ninety minutes and extra time.

Teams

Stadiums and locations

Personnel and kits

Head coaching changes

Roster changes

Marquee players

Foreign players
Besides the marquee player, each Indian Super League side must sign at least eight foreign players with the maximum capped at 10.

Regular season

League table

Results table

Playoffs

Season statistics

Scoring

Top scorers

Top Indian scorers

Hat-tricks

Assists

Clean sheets

Attendance

Average home attendances

Highest attendances 
Regular season

Awards
Source: Indian Super League website

Hero of the Match

ISL Emerging Player of the Match

ISL Player of the Week award

Awarded weekly to the player that was chosen by fan voting on google.co.in

ISL Team of the Season

End-of-season awards

References

External links
 

 
Indian Super League seasons
1
India